Southern Electric plc was a public limited energy company in the United Kingdom between 1990 and 1998, when it merged with Scottish Hydro-Electric plc to form Scottish and Southern Energy plc (now SSE plc). The company had its origins in the southern England region of the British nationalised electricity industry. Created in 1948 as the Southern Electricity Board, in 1990 it was privatised by being floated on the London Stock Exchange.

History
The company originated as the Southern Electricity Board, created in 1948 as part of the nationalisation of the electricity industry by the Electricity Act 1947. The board's assets passed in 1990 to Southern Electric plc, one of the fourteen public electricity suppliers, and that company was privatised in the same year. In 1998 the company merged with Scottish Hydro-Electric plc and became part of Scottish and Southern Energy.

SSE used the "Southern Electric" name and logo for a time as a brand name for retail distribution of gas and electricity in the south of England, before replacing it with SSE branding. Following the purchase of SSE's retail business by OVO Energy in 2020, the Southern Electric brand is a trading name of OVO Electricity Limited.

Southern Electricity Board 
The key people on the board were: Chairman Henry Nimmo (1948–54), Chairman R.R.B. Brown (1964, 1967), Deputy Chairman W.B. Poulter (1964, 1967), full-time member A. W. Bunch (1967).

The number of customers supplied by the board was:

The amount of electricity, in GWh, sold by the Southern Electricity Board over its operational life was:

Operations
The Southern Electric name continues to be used by SSE's subsidiary Southern Electric Power Distribution plc, the distribution network operator in the south of England.

In April 2013 the UK electricity market regulator OFGEM fined Southern Electric £10.5 million for breaches of conduct in relation to mis-selling, from the top of the business down.

See also
Companies merged into Southern Electricity Board (SEB)

References

Electric power companies of the United Kingdom
Utilities of the United Kingdom
Former nationalised industries of the United Kingdom
Companies based in Berkshire
Non-renewable resource companies established in 1990
Companies disestablished in 1998
1990 establishments in England
1998 disestablishments in England